Kingwood may refer to:

 Kingwood (wood), a classic wood used for inlay work in furniture

Places
 Kingwood Center, Mansfield, Ohio, USA
 Kingwood, Houston, Texas, USA
 Kingwood, West Virginia, USA
 Kingwood Township, New Jersey, USA

Music
 Kingwood (album), an album by the Swedish punk rock group Millencolin

See also
 Kingswood (disambiguation)